Wild quince may refer to one of several plant species:

Alectryon subcinereus, an Australian tree in the family Sapindaceae
Callicoma serratifolia, an Australian tree in the family Cunoniaceae
Cydonia oblonga, wild relatives of the cultivated quince tree
Guioa semiglauca, an Australian tree in the family Sapindaceae